The International Society for Sexual Medicine (ISSM) is a medical society devoted to the study of the medicine of human sexuality. It publishes two journals, The Journal of Sexual Medicine, and the open-access Sexual Medicine Reviews. It was founded in 1978 and was formerly known as the ISIR/ISSIR.

References 

Medical associations
Sexuality
Medical and health organisations based in the Netherlands